The Murgitroyd T20 competition was the highest level of Twenty20 club cricket played in Scotland.  The national competition, comprisied four regional qualifying competitions - the Rowan Cup (played in the west region), the Masterton Trophy (played in the east region), the Caledonian T20 (played in the north region) and the Borders T20 (played in the south region) - and a Finals Day is organised by Cricket Scotland.  As of 2019 the competition winners were: 
 2008: Carlton Cricket Club
 2009: Greenock Cricket Club
 2010: Carlton Cricket Club
 2011: Carlton Cricket Club
 2012: Carlton Cricket Club
 2013: Grange Cricket Club
 2014: Grange Cricket Club
 2015: Forfarshire Cricket Club
 2016: Grange Cricket Club
 2017: Watsonians Cricket Club
 2018: Heriot's Cricket Club
 2019: Forfarshire Cricket Club

It was sponsored by Glasgow-based international intellectual property business, Murgitroyd between 2008 and 2019.

See also
Regional Pro Series

References

Scottish domestic cricket competitions
Twenty20 cricket leagues
Recurring sporting events established in 2008
Professional cricket leagues
Professional sports leagues in the United Kingdom